The Cooperation Council for the Arab States of the Gulf, also known as the  Gulf Cooperation Council (GCC), is a regional, intergovernmental, political, and economic union comprising Bahrain, Kuwait, Oman, Qatar, Saudi Arabia, and the United Arab Emirates. The council's main headquarters is located in Riyadh, the capital of Saudi Arabia. The Charter of the GCC was signed on 25 May 1981, formally establishing the institution.

All current member states are monarchies, including three constitutional monarchies (Qatar, Kuwait, and Bahrain), two absolute monarchies (Saudi Arabia and Oman), and one federal monarchy (the United Arab Emirates, which is composed of seven member states, each of which is an absolute monarchy with its own emir). There have been discussions regarding the future membership of Jordan, Morocco, and Yemen.

During the Arab Spring in 2012, Saudi Arabia proposed to transform the GCC into a "Gulf Union" with tighter economic, political and military coordination, a move considered to be intended to counterbalance Iranian influence in the region, however objections were raised by other countries. In 2014, Bahraini prime minister Khalifa bin Salman Al Khalifa said that current events in the region highlighted the importance of the proposal. The Peninsula Shield Force is the military arm of the GCC, formed in 1984.

Founding
An economic agreement between the countries of the Gulf Cooperation Council was signed on 11 November 1981 in Abu Dhabi, UAE. These countries are often referred to as "the GCC states".

Objectives
In 2001, the GCC Supreme Council set the following goals:
 Customs union in January 2003
 Common market by 2007
 Common currency by 2010

Oman announced in December 2006 that it would not be able to meet the 2010 target date for a common currency. Following the announcement that the central bank for the monetary union would be located in Riyadh, Saudi Arabia, rather than in the UAE, they announced their withdrawal from the monetary union project in May 2009. The name Khaleeji has been proposed as a name for this currency. If realized, the GCC monetary union would be the second-largest supranational monetary union in the world, measured by the GDP of the common-currency area.

Other stated objectives include:
 Formulating similar regulations in various fields such as religion, finance, trade, customs, tourism, legislation, and administration.
 Fostering scientific and technical progress in industry, mining, agriculture, water, and animal resources.
 Establishing scientific research centers.
 Setting up joint ventures.
 Unified military (Peninsula Shield Force).
 Encouraging cooperation of the private sector.
 Strengthening ties between their people.

The area has some of the fastest-growing economies in the world, mostly due to a boom in oil and natural gas revenues coupled with a building and investment boom backed by decades of saved petroleum revenues. In an effort to build a tax base and economic foundation before the reserves run out, the UAE's investment arms, including Abu Dhabi Investment Authority, retain over US$900 billion in assets. Other regional funds have several hundreds of billions of dollars of assets under management.

The region is an emerging hotspot for events, including the 2006 Asian Games in Doha, Qatar. Doha also submitted an unsuccessful application for the 2016 Summer Olympics. Qatar would later host the 2022 FIFA World Cup.

Recovery plans have been criticized for crowding out the private sector, failing to set clear priorities for growth, failing to restore weak consumer and investor confidence, and undermining long-term stability.

Logo
The logo of the GCC consists of two concentric circles. On the upper part of the larger circle, the phrase Bismillah - in the name of God - is written in Arabic, which means "In the name of God", and on the lower part of the circle the council's full name is written in Arabic. The inner-circle contains an embossed hexagonal shape representing the six countries. The inside of the hexagon shows a map encompassing the Arabian Peninsula, on which the areas of the member countries are colored in brown, borderless.

Economy

Internal market
A common market was launched on 1 January 2008, easing movement of goods and services, with plans to create a fully integrated single market. Implementation later lagged behind, after the 2009 financial crisis. The creation of a customs union began in 2003, and was completed and fully operational by 1 January 2015. In January 2015, the common market was also further integrated, covering full equality among GCC citizens to work in government and private sectors, the ability to access social insurance and retirement coverage, real estate ownership rights, capital movement, and access to education, health and other social services, in all member states. However, some barriers remained in the free movement of goods and services. The coordination of taxation systems, accounting standards and civil legislation is currently in progress. The interoperability of professional qualifications, insurance certificates and identity documents is also underway.

Monetary union
In 2014, Bahrain, Kuwait, Qatar, and Saudi Arabia took major steps to ensure the creation of a single currency. Kuwait's finance minister said the four members are pushing ahead with the monetary union but said some "technical points" need to be cleared. He added, "A common market and common central bank would also position the GCC as one entity that would have great influence on the international financial system". The implementation of a single currency and the creation of a central bank is overseen by the Monetary Council.

There is currently a degree to which a nominal GCC single currency already exists. Businesses trade using a basket of GCC currencies, just as before the Euro was introduced, the European Currency Unit (ECU) had been used as a nominal medium of exchange. Plans to introduce a single currency had been drawn up as far back as 2009, however due to the financial crisis of 2007–2008 and political differences, the UAE and Oman withdrew their membership.

Mergers and acquisitions
Companies and investors from GCC countries are active in mergers and acquisitions. Since 1999, more than 5,200 transactions with a known value of US$573 billion had been announced. Investors include a number of sovereign wealth funds.

Infrastructure
The GCC launched common economic projects to promote and facilitate integration and to increase resilency. The GCC Interconnection Grid connects the power grids of member states. In 2009, it initiated operations and by 2013, all six members were connected.  A water interconnection project has been discussed but, as of January 2023, there have been no notable developments.  Unlike other leading aviation regions like the European  Union, members have not agreed to an open skies policy. As such, GCC airlines do not have unlimited market access rights to member states and compete to capture international air traffic flows. 

The GCC has also launched major rail projects to connect the peninsula. The railways are expected to fuel intra-regional trade while helping reduce fuel consumption. According to Ramiz Al Assar, Resident World Bank advisor for the GCC, it will link the six member states as a regional transport corridor, further integrating with the national railway projects, deepening economic social and political integration, and it is developed from a sustainable perspective.

The project, estimated to be worth $15.5 billion, was scheduled to be completed by 2021. As of May 2022, railway construction UAE and Saudia Arabia have progressed significantly, but other members' efforts have lagged. Saudi Arabian Railways, Etihad Rail, and their respective national governments have invested 15 billion dollars as of early 2015 into railway infrastructure to create rail networks for transporting freight, connecting cities, and reducing transport times.

Politics and governance

Supreme Council
The GCC Supreme Council is composed of the heads of state of the member states. It is the highest decision-making entity of the GCC, setting its vision and goals. Decisions on important issues require unanimous approval, while issues on procedural matters require a majority. Each member state has one vote. The presidency rotates based on the alphabetical order of the names of the member states.

Ministerial Council
The Ministerial Council is composed of the Foreign Ministers of all the member states. It convenes every three months. It formulates policies, and makes recommendations to promote cooperation and achieve coordination among the member states, when implementing ongoing projects. Decisions are submitted in the form of recommendations, which the Supreme Council can approve. The Ministerial Council is also responsible for preparations of meetings of the Supreme Council and its agenda. The voting procedure in the Ministerial Council is the same as in the Supreme Council.

Secretariat General
The Secretariat is the executive arm of the Gulf Cooperation Council. It takes decisions within its authority, and implements decisions approved by the Supreme or Ministerial Council. The Secretariat also compiles studies relating to cooperation, coordination, and planning for common actions, and occasionally releases reports regarding the work done by the GCC as a whole, and the implementation of its own decisions. The current Secretary-General is Nayef Falah Mubarak Al Hajraf, and his deputies include Abdulaziz Al Auwaishig and Khalifa Alfadhel.

Monetary Council
On 15 December 2009, Bahrain, Kuwait, Qatar, and Saudi Arabia announced the creation of a Monetary Council, to introduce a single currency for the union. The board of the council, which set a timetable and action plan for establishing a central bank and chose a currency regime, met for the first time on 30 March 2010. Kuwaiti foreign minister Mohammad Sabah Al-Sabah said on 8 December 2009 that a single currency may take up to ten years to establish. Oman and the UAE later announced their withdrawal from the proposed currency.

In 2014, major moves were taken to ensure the launch of a single currency. Kuwait's finance minister stated that a currency should be implemented without delay. Negotiations with the UAE and Oman to expand the monetary union were renewed.

Patent Office

The GCC Patent Office was approved in 1992, and established soon after in Riyadh, Saudi Arabia. Applications are filed and prosecuted in the Arabic language before it and grants patents valid in all GCC member states, but is a separate office from the Saudi Arabian Patent Office. The first GCC patent was granted in 2002. As of 2013, it employed about 30 patent examiners.

Peninsula Shield Force

Amidst the Bahraini uprising, Saudi Arabia and the UAE sent ground troops to Bahrain in order to protect vital infrastructure such as the airport and highway system. Kuwait and Oman refrained from sending troops. Instead, Kuwait sent a navy unit.

The secretary-general of the GCC strongly endorsed the use of international force in Libya. GCC member states joined coalition efforts to enforce the no-fly zone.

In September 2014, GCC members Saudi Arabia, Bahrain, UAE and Qatar, and pending member Jordan commenced air operations against the Islamic State of Iraq and the Levant (ISIL) in Syria. Saudi Arabia and the UAE, however, are among the states that oppose the Muslim Brotherhood in Syria, whereas Qatar has historically supported it. They also pledged other support including operating training facilities for Syrian rebels, in Saudi Arabia, and allowing the use of their airbases by other countries fighting ISIL. Some GCC countries also send some troops to fight the opposition government in Yemen.

GCC Standardization Organization
 
The GCC Standardization Organization is the standardization organization of the GCC. Yemen is also a member of the GCC Standardization Organization.

Gulf Organization for Industrial Consulting
 
The Gulf Organization for Industrial Consulting (GOIC) was founded in 1976 by the six GCC member states; Yemen joined the organization in 2009. It is headquartered at Doha, Qatar. The organization chart of GOIC includes the board members and the General Secretariat. The Board is formed by member state representatives appointed by their governments.

Secretaries-General

Member states
There are six member states of the union:

Associated members
The associate membership of Iraq in certain GCC-related institutions was cancelled after the invasion of Kuwait.

Yemen was in negotiations for GCC membership in 2007, and hoped to join by 2016. Yemen is already a member of the GCC Standardization Authority, the Gulf Organization for Industrial Consulting (GOIC), the GCC Auditing and Accounting Authority, the Gulf Radio and TV Authority, the GCC Council of Health Ministers, the GCC Education and Training Bureau, the GCC Council of Labour & and Social Affairs Ministers, and The Gulf Cup Football Tournament. The Council issued directives that all the necessary legal measures be taken, so that Yemen would have the same rights and obligations of GCC member states in those institutions.

Sports

The union has served as a grouping for sports co-operation and competition. The GCC states have an annual meeting of the Youth and Sports Ministers of each state to boost youth and sports initiatives in the region. The promotion of the hosting of international sports events has also served an economic purpose for the union's countries, leading to investment and development in the region.

The GCC Games, a quadrennial multi-sport event, was established by the union and first held in 2011. There are numerous long-running GCC Championships for individual sports, including: the Gulf Cooperation Council Athletics Championships (first held in 1986; youth section from 2000) sailing, basketball, swimming, tennis, gymnastics (senior and youth levels), weightlifting, futsal, snooker, and table tennis.

2014 Qatar–Saudi diplomatic conflict

Qatar's support for the Muslim Brotherhood across the Middle East-North Africa (MENA) region, Hamas and radical Islamists in Libya, has led to increasing tensions with other Arab states of the Persian Gulf. These tensions came to a head during a March 2014 meeting of the GCC, after which the UAE, Saudi Arabia and Bahrain recalled their ambassadors to Qatar.

Some financial economists have interpreted the 2014 Saudi–Qatari rift as a tangible political sign of a growing economic rivalry between oil and natural gas producers, which could "have deep and long-lasting consequences" beyond MENA.

2017 Qatar diplomatic crisis

On 5 June 2017, Bahrain, Saudi Arabia, the UAE, Indonesia, Maldives and Egypt had officially cut diplomatic ties with Qatar. Saudi Arabia said it took the decision to cut diplomatic ties due to Qatar's "embrace of various terrorist and sectarian groups aimed at destabilising the region", including the Muslim Brotherhood, al-Qaeda, ISIL and Iran-supported groups in Saudi Arabia's eastern province of Qatif. Political researcher Islam Hassan viewed this rift as a continuation of Qatar's foreign policy rivalry with Saudi Arabia and the UAE.

In June 2017, Saudi Arabia, the United Arab Emirates, and Bahrain put a ban on Qataris and their businesses. Qataris were not allowed to enter or live in Saudi Arabia, the United Arab Emirates, or Bahrain, unless they had a spouse living there, in which case they were required to carry a visa in order to enter these countries. Qatar Airways aircraft were not allowed to fly over these countries. Saudi Arabia stated that they would turn its land border with Qatar into a canal, known as the Salwa Canal, in 2018. The plan was abandoned in 2019.

On 4 January 2021, Kuwait National TV announced that Saudi Arabia would restore all diplomatic ties with Qatar, reopen air space to Qatari aircraft and reopen the Qatar–Saudi land border.

Later that evening, it was announced that Bahrain, the United Arab Emirates and Egypt agreed to restore ties with Qatar. On 4 January 2021, it was made official at the Al-Ula summit, where the blockading countries, along with Qatar, signed an official agreement and ended the rift after three years and seven months.

GCC and US-GCC Summit meetings

2022 US-GCC Summit

Related states

Since the creation of the council in 1981 its membership has not expanded, with all members being Arab monarchies.

Some GCC countries have land borders with Iraq, Jordan or Yemen, and sea borders with Iran, Egypt, Sudan, Eritrea or Somalia.

Egypt
Only the Sinai Peninsula of Egypt lies in the Arabian Peninsula. In 2011, Bahrain's Foreign Minister called for Egypt to be admitted as a member of the GCC.

Iraq
Iraq is the only Arab country bordering the Persian Gulf, in addition to lying in the arabian peninsula that is not a member of the GCC, despite the societal, political differences between Iraq and its neighboring Gulf states, in 2012, former Iraqi Defence Minister Saadoun Al-Dulaimi stated that Iraq wanted to join the GCC. Kuwait supported Iraq joining the GCC, however no progress has been made.

Iran
At the December 2012 Manama summit, the GCC states called for an end to Iranian interference in their internal affairs.

Jordan and Morocco
In May 2011, Jordan's request to join the GCC, which had been first submitted 15 years earlier, was accepted and Morocco was invited to join the union. In September 2011, a five-year economic plan for both countries was put forward after a meeting between the foreign ministers of both countries and those of the GCC states. Although a plan for accession was being looked into, it was noted that there was no timetable for either's accession, and that discussions would continue.

As Jordan and Morocco are the only two Arabic-speaking monarchies not currently in the council, the current members see them as strong potential allies. Jordan borders Saudi Arabia and is economically connected to the Persian Gulf States. Although Morocco is not near the Persian Gulf, the Moroccan foreign minister Taieb Fassi Fihri notes that "geographical distance is no obstacle to a strong relationship".

Yemen
Yemen was in negotiations for GCC membership, and hoped to join by 2015. Although it has no coastline on the Persian Gulf, Yemen lies in the Arabian Peninsula.

Related organizations

The GCC members and Yemen are also members of the Greater Arab Free Trade Area (GAFTA). However, this is unlikely to affect the agenda of the GCC significantly as it has a more aggressive timetable than GAFTA and is seeking greater integration.

See also

 Arab League
 Arabian Peninsula
 BankMuscat Direct
 Eastern Arabia
 Peninsula Shield Force
 Khaleeji (currency)
 Gulf Railway
 Qatar diplomatic crisis

Notes

References

Further reading
 
 Bianco, C. (2020a). The GCC monarchies: Perceptions of the Iranian threat amid shifting geopolitics. The International Spectator, 55(2), 92–107.
 Bianco, C. (2020b). A Gulf apart: How Europe can gain influence with the Gulf Cooperation Council. European Council on Foreign Relations, February 2020. Available at https://ecfr.eu/archive/page/-/a_gulf_apart_how_europe_can_gain_influence_with_gulf_cooperation_council.pdf.
 Bianco, C. (2021). Can Europe Choreograph a Saudi-Iranian Détente? European University Institute, Robert Schuman Center for Advanced Studies, Middle East Directions. Available at: https://cadmus.eui.eu/bitstream/handle/1814/70351/PB_2021_10-MED.pdf?sequence=1.
 Bianco, C., & Stansfield, G. (2018). The intra-GCC crises: Mapping GCC fragmentation after 2011. International Affairs, 94(3), 613–635.
 Miniaoui, Héla, ed. Economic Development in the Gulf Cooperation Council Countries: From Rentier States to Diversified Economies. Vol. 1. Springer Nature, 2020.
 Guzansky, Y., & Even, S. (2020). The economic crisis in the Gulf States: A challenge to the "contract" between rulers and ruled. INSS Insight No. 1327, June 1, 2020. Available at https://www.INSS.org.il/publication/gulf-states-economy/?offset=7&posts=201&outher=Yoel%20Guzansky.
 Guzansky, Y., & Marshall, Z. A. (2020). The Abraham accords: Immediate significance and long-term implications. Israel Journal of Foreign Affairs, 1–11.
 Guzansky, Y., & Segal, E. (2020). All in the family: Leadership changes in the Gulf. INSS Insight No. 1378, August 30, 2020. Available at: https://www.INSS.org.il/publication/gulf-royal-families/?offset=1&posts=201&outher=Yoel%20Guzansky
 Guzansky, Y., & Winter, O. (2020). Apolitical Normalization: A New Approach to Jews in Arab States. INSS Insight No. 1332, June 8, 2020. Available at: https://www.INSS.org.il/publication/judaism-in-the-arab-world/?offset=5&posts=201&outher=Yoel%20Guzansky.
  see https://www.researchgate.net/publication/290349218_The_political_algebra_of_global_value_change_General_models_and_implications_for_the_Muslim_world
 
 Woertz, Eckart. "Wither the self-sufficiency illusion? Food security in Arab Gulf States and the impact of COVID-19." Food Security 12.4 (2020): 757-760.
 Zweiri, Mahjoob, Md Mizanur Rahman, and Arwa Kamal, eds. The 2017 Gulf Crisis: An Interdisciplinary Approach. Vol. 3. Springer Nature, 2020.

External links

The Gulf Organization for Industrial Consulting (GOIC)

 
1981 establishments in the United Arab Emirates
1981 in economics
Arabian Peninsula
Articles containing video clips
Continental unions
Customs unions
Economic integration
Intellectual property organizations
Intergovernmental organizations established by treaty
International economic organizations
International organizations based in Asia
International organizations based in the Middle East
Organizations established in 1981
Pan-Arabism
Proposed currencies
Supranational unions
Trade blocs
Bahrain–Iran relations
Iran–Kuwait relations
Iran–Oman relations
Iran–Qatar relations
Iran–Saudi Arabia relations
Iran–Saudi Arabia military relations
Iran–Saudi Arabia proxy conflict
Iran–United Arab Emirates relations